The Forrest Theatre is a live theatre venue at 1114 Walnut Street Center City area of Philadelphia, Pennsylvania. It has a seating capacity of 1,851 and is managed by The Shubert Organization.

The original Forrest Theatre was on Broad and Sansom Street but Fidelity Trust Company demolished it and replaced it in 1928 with the Fidelity-Philadelphia Trust Company Building (now the Wells Fargo Building).

The new theatre was built in 1927 at the cost of $2 million, and was designed by architect Herbert J. Krapp; it was named after the 19th century actor Edwin Forrest, who was born in Philadelphia, and owned and lived in the Edwin Forrest House. The opening performance was The Red Robe in 1928. A renovation of the theatre was undertaken in 1997, including redecoration and the addition of handicapped-accessible restrooms.

Over the years, the Forrest Theatre has been a proving ground for various Broadway plays and musicals, serving as the location for previews and try-outs of these productions. Some of the shows that played at the Forrest prior to moving to Broadway include The Women (1936), Make Mine Manhattan (1948), Wonderful Town (1953), The Music Man (1957), Funny Girl (1963), The Star-Spangled Girl (1966), Breakfast at Tiffany's (1966), Golden Rainbow (1967), The Wiz (1974), and Chicago (1975).

Since the 2007–08 season, the Forrest Theatre has joined with the Kimmel Center for the Performing Arts to offer a season of Broadway touring productions.

References
Notes

External links

Official website

1927 establishments in Pennsylvania
Center City, Philadelphia
Shubert Organization
Theatres completed in 1927
Theatres in Philadelphia